The Letti Islands of Indonesia are part of the Maluku Islands, in southwest Maluku Province. (The spelling Leti Islands is also used sometimes.) They are also called the "Lemola" Archipelago, from the initial two letters of each of the three main islands, Letti, Moa and Lakor; each of the three islands now constitutes a separate administrative district (kecamatan) within the Maluku Barat Daya Regency (Kabupaten Maluku Barat Daya)

The islands cover  in area and supported a population of 16,664 at the 2010 Census, which had increased to 26,870 at the 2020 Census. The most significant town is Pati, on Moa.  Industries include the cultivation of rice, coconut palms and tobacco, animal husbandry, and fishing.

Letti proper, the westernmost island, covers 243.5 km2 and had a population of 8,060 in 2020. The island is a triangular mountain ridge, subtended by Koli Besar mountain in the east and the Rapat mountains in the west.

Moa, the central and largest island, covers 959.68 km2 and had a population of 16,294 in 2020.  Tiakur is the administrative centre for the Regency; it has an area of 45,43 km2 and had a population of 3,546 at the 2020 Census.

Lakor, the easternmost island, covers 303.32 km2 and had a population of 2,516 in 2020.

The Letti Islands are part of the Banda Sea Islands moist deciduous forests ecoregion.

Languages
The Leti language, a member of the Austronesian languages group, is spoken on Letti islands.

Administration
The Letti Islands form the Letti, Lakor and Moa Lakor districts of the Southwest Maluku Regency within Maluku Province.

The office of the district head (camat) of Letti is located in Serwaru, on the northern coast of Letti. The office of the camat of Moa Lakor is located in Weet on Moa. The office of the camat of Lakor is located in Wewawan on Lakor.

See also

 Islands of Indonesia
 Maluku Islands
 Maluku (province)

References

External links

 Satellite imagery from Google Maps

Barat Daya Islands
Archipelagoes of Indonesia
Landforms of Maluku (province)
Outer Banda Arc
Populated places in Indonesia